Tragasai, was a town of the ancient Troad.

Its site is located near Tuzla, Asiatic Turkey.

References

Populated places in ancient Troad
Former populated places in Turkey